Herron High School is a public charter school in Indianapolis, Indiana.  It opened for the 2006–2007 school year. Herron is a college preparatory school, providing a classical-based education, and serves grades 9–12.  It is located at 110 East 16th Street, just north of downtown Indianapolis in the building formerly occupied by Herron School of Art and Design of Indiana University – Purdue University Indianapolis, with which it is not affiliated.
 
Herron High School has five solids or core classes. Students are required to take all five solids throughout their entire time at Herron. The five solids are Math, English, Science, Social Studies and a foreign language. In addition, numerous other electives are offered, including advanced jazz band, Latin, French, Spanish, various performing arts, and various visual arts. Paintings by alumni and current students adorn the hallways as well.

History

Herron High School opened in 2006. It was initially started in the basement of the nearby Harrison Center with only 98 freshmen. It moved to its current location, on 16th and Pennsylvania, in 2007. Herron has continued to grow and has now opened its second campus, Riverside High School.

Notes

Education in Indianapolis
Preparatory schools in Indiana
Charter schools in Indiana
High schools in Indiana
2003 establishments in Indiana